The Panoche Hills are a low mountain range in the Southern Inner California Coast Ranges System, in western Fresno County, California.

They are east of the Diablo Range, on the west side of the San Joaquin Valley.  They define the eastern side of the Panoche Valley.

Parks

Panoche Hills Recreation Area
The US Bureau of Land Management (BLM) maintains the Panoche Hills Recreation Area,  a recreation area within the hills. The entrance to the BLM area is across Little Panoche Road from the Mercey Hot Springs resort. This BLM land is under Fire Season Vehicle Restrictions from mid-April to mid-October. No motorized access is allowed during this time period.

Panoche Hills Ecological Reserve
The California Department of Fish and Game also maintains the Panoche Hills Ecological Reserve, an ecological reserve within the hills.

Natural history
The Hills contain examples of fossilized remains of Mesozoic era cold seeps.

See also
 Panoche Pass
 Panoche Valley

References 

Mountain ranges of Fresno County, California
California Coast Ranges
Hills of California
Geography of the San Joaquin Valley
Bureau of Land Management areas in California